"After All This Time" was the third and final single released from Blue band-member Simon Webbe's debut solo album, Sanctuary. The song failed to become Webbe's third top-five single, peaking at number 16 on the UK Singles Chart. The song later featured in a historic montage in an episode of BBC2's Top Gear.

Track listings
UK CD1
 "After All This Time"
 "No Worries" (Lovestar Remix)

UK CD2
 "After All This Time"
 "No Pressure on You"
 "Take Me as I Am"

UK DVD single
 "After All This Time" (video)
 Behind the Scenes at video shoot
 Photo gallery featuring "No Worries" (Breakdown Mix)

Charts

References

2006 singles
Simon Webbe songs
Songs written by Matt Prime
Songs written by Simon Webbe
Songs written by Tim Woodcock